Freaknik: The Musical is an American animated musical television special produced by T-Pain. It features the voice of T-Pain as the Ghost of Freaknik, as well as the voices of entertainers such as Lil Wayne, Young Cash, Snoop Dogg, Sophia Fresh, and Rick Ross, and comedians such as Andy Samberg and Charlie Murphy who provide additional voices. It was scheduled to air on Cartoon Network's late night programming block Adult Swim sometime in 2009, but after several push-backs, it premiered on March 7, 2010. The musical is based on the actual music festival of the same name that used to take place in Atlanta, Georgia.

A soundtrack was released by Jive Records and Nappy Boy Entertainment on April 20, 2010. The 49-minute uncut version of Freaknik: The Musical has been released on DVD and other forms of home media.

Plot 
The film starts at a party that a group of young adults (Christopher "Kid" Reid and Affion Crockett) claims is the best party which they have ever attended. An elderly man (Lil Jon) joins the party and explains the history of Freaknik. He tells them that Freaknik threw the biggest party of all time, until it was broken up by the police in 1998; he claims the police "killed" Freaknik. Kid n' Play tries to convince them that Freaknik is an urban legend like Candyman, but as Play looks in the mirror, they are eaten by a swarm of wasps. The group is then led by the old man in summoning Freaknik, who appears as the Ghost of Freaknik Past (T-Pain).

The scene changes to a radio announcer named Mr. Thanksgiving (DJ Drama), who is interviewing Freaknik. Mr. Thanksgiving and Freaknik explain that a rapping contest will be held, the victory of which will get "a lifetime supply of money, clothes, and hoes". The scene changes once more to the bedroom of Virgil (Young Cash), Big Uzi (Rick Ross), and Light Skin (CeeLo Green), collectively known as the Sweet Tea Mobsters, a group of young adult rappers from Sweet Tea, Florida, who hope to achieve fame. The group decides to drive to Atlanta to participate in the aforementioned contest, along with their weed-smoking (and supplying) friend Doela Man (DJ Pooh).

During their journey, Light Skin tells of a secret society of African Americans called the Boule, fraternity parlance for "a council of noblemen", that seeks to guide the course of black culture. The members of this organization are parodies of Oprah Winfrey, Al Sharpton (Charlie Murphy), Bill Cosby (Kel Mitchell), Russell Simmons (Affion Crockett), O. J. Simpson, and Jesse Jackson.  They wear medallions inscribed "10%", an allusion to the W. E. B. Du Bois essay The Talented Tenth, which says that a class of exceptional members of the black race will rise to lead it.

The Sweet Tea Mobsters make a number of pit stops, including a detour at a college fraternity party where they meet two alcoholic fraternity members (Bill Hader and Andy Samberg). While Virgil is fueling the gas tank, A car, inhabited by four sexy-looking women (Sophia Fresh) named Leacosia (Crystal), Toprameneesha (Skye), Obamaniqua (Cole Rose), and Suzie (Crystal), arrives. He tried to refuse, but the girls beg in song, besides Leacosia giving Virgil a kiss in the form of a gun. He accepts.

Meanwhile, Freaknik meets Rev. Sharpton, who tried to force him to work for the Boule. The plan fails as Freaknik says that he will "never, ever turn his back on his own people", so he escorts Sharpton out via trapdoor.

At the party, the group meets the Fruit Bowl Boys (Kel Mitchell, Affion Crockett, and Denzel Whitaker), who later become the group's biggest competition and are from the mostly white suburbs of Sweet Tea, Florida (although they resemble the Sweet Tea Mobsters). On their long, winding road trip, the Sweet Tea Mob gets lost in New Orleans and are confronted by a gangster (Snoop Dogg) who makes them visit his boss, Trap Jesus (Lil Wayne). Upon meeting Trap Jesus, the group loses hope, thinking it is the end, but instead he inspires them to compete and gives them one of his many Lamborghinis to use to get to Atlanta. However, they crash the Lamborghini when Big Uzi becomes enraged after hearing the Fruit Bowl Boys talking about his jail experience. The group gives up except Virgil, who believes that winning the contest is their destiny. The rest of the group still doesn't believe him until they are given a ride in an airplane by the "Flying Malcolms."

Meanwhile, the Freaknik character is elected the "ghost mayor of Atlanta" and dubs the city "Freaknation." Soon after, President Barack Obama hands the presidency over to the ghost of Freaknik, a move that greatly angers Oprah, which wants to see Freaknik destroyed. She devises a plan to send a giant robotic monster called the "Perminator" (a robotic version of Al Sharpton, rebuilt from Sharpton's corpse after he got hit by lightning while blowing out his hair) to Atlanta to destroy Freaknik. Meanwhile, at the party, the Fruit Bowl Boys begin singing "Shank Ya in the Shower." The Sweet Tea Mobsters arrive at Atlanta at the same time as the Perminator begins its attack; it kills the Fruit Bowl Boys almost immediately. He seems to have Freaknik down for the count, but mass love from the crowd empowers Freaknik as the Mob performs, giving him the ability to grow to a monstrous size. Using the love of his fans, Freaknik is able to destroy the Perminator.

After the fight, Freaknik declares the Sweet Tea Mobsters the winners of the contest, but Virgil refuses the prize and tears the check in half. He tells Freaknik that he doesn't need it as long as Freaknik comes back every year, but before he can finish speaking, a golden lion statue-shaped ship comes right in, inhabited by the members of the Boule. But as Freaknik is about to disqualify them, a dog-shaped spacecraft called the "Mothership Connection" arrives, killing the Boule and their ship (Note: This scene can only be seen on the uncut version of the special). It is inhabited by three brightly colored aliens who are actually George Clinton, Bootsy Collins, and Gene "King Poo Poo Man" Anderson. They say they have come to take Freaknik because "there are other galaxies that need his powers of positivity", saying that maybe someday he will return and they can "funk it up" once again. Freaknik gives Virgil his gold chain and says that Atlanta will always be his home. Suzie approaches Freaknik, telling him her baby (which looks like Freaknik) needs a father. Freaknik then rushes on board the ship with Clinton, Collins, and Anderson. Mr. Thanksgiving, the radio DJ from the beginning of the show, then speaks, saying how crazy that was and they'll see us next time; Freaknik is seen dancing on the Mothership as it leaves Earth. And after the end credits, we see Sweet Tea taping the check back together.

Voice cast 

 T-Pain as The Ghost of Freaknik Past
 Rick Ross as Big Uzi Theodore
 CeeLo Green as Light Skin Juliens
 DJ Pooh as Doela Man
 Young Cash as Virgil Gibson
 Lil Jon as the foreboding old dude
 DJ Drama as Mr. Thanksgiving
 Kelis as Tyra Banks
 Charlie Murphy as Al Sharpton
 Andy Samberg as Chad
 Bill Hader as Tad
 Affion Crockett as Russell Simmons, Fruit Bowl Boys member, Christopher Martin, Riff, Flying Malcolm #1, various
 Kel Mitchell as Fruit Bowl Boys frontman, Bill Cosby, various
 Big Boi as The Preacher
 Snoop Dogg as gang member #1
 Mack Maine as gang member #2
 Lil Wayne as Trap Jesus
 Sophia Fresh as Leacosia, Toprameneesha, Obamaniqua, Suzie
 George Clinton as an alien version of himself
 Bootsy Collins as an alien version of himself
 Gene "King Poo Poo Man" Anderson as an alien version of himself
 Corey Burton as The Balladeer, newscaster
 Christopher Reid as himself
 Maronzio Vance as Jesse Jackson
 Marlin Hill as Barack Obama
 Carl Jones as a landlord and a partygoer
 Liz Benoit as Oprah Winfrey
 Denzel Whitaker as a member of the Fruit Bowl Boys
 Georgette Perna as secretary, girl
 Reggie Boyland as a partygoer

Additional voices are provided by: Slink Johnson, Heather Lawless, Jason Van Veen, and Jason Walden.

Production
Freaknik: The Musical originally evolved from a failed pilot entitled That Crook'd 'Sipp which was created by Mike Weiss, Jacob Escobedo, and Nick Weidenfeld, as well starring David Banner. The pilot premiered on television on May 13, 2007.  Originally, the pilot was to receive six additional episodes scheduled to air sometime after 2007, but the episodes never surfaced and the show's status remained up in the air until mid-2009 when the series was scrapped for good in order to create this special. Characters including Big Uzi, Suzy and Virgil all appeared in That Crook'd Sipp.

Reception
In its original American broadcast on March 7, 2010, Freaknik: The Musical was watched by 797,000 viewers 18-34, making it the second most watched Adult Swim program of that night, behind a rerun of Family Guy.

IGN gave this episode a 6.1 out of 10, which is considered "Passable", and received comments both positive and negative.

Home media
On March 8, 2010, the animated special was released for purchase on the iTunes Store. The uncut 49-minute-long version of Freaknik: The Musical was released on one-disc DVD set in the United States on October 26, 2010, from Warner Home Video and included the soundtrack.

Soundtrack 
It was announced by T-Pain that a soundtrack would be released through Jive Records, Konvict Muzik and Nappy Boy on April 20, 2010. The track "Ghetto Commandments", the credits outro song, was released on iTunes as a single on March 23 and it features rappers Snoop Dogg & Mack Maine who also play in the movie; it was released the same day as the release of T-Pain's promo single for his album "rEVOLVEr" "Reverse Cowgirl". The Rick Ross song "Grab Yo Beltloop" didn't make the  final cut for the album.

References

External links 

Adult Swim pilots and specials
2010 television specials
2010s animated television specials
Atlanta in fiction
Musical television specials
Ghosts in television
African-American television
Hip hop television
2010s American television specials
African-American musical films
American animated musical films